Anthony Rotondo (born 1957) is a former capo in the DeCavalcante family of New Jersey and police informant.

Early life 
Anthony Rotondo lived with his father Vincent "Jimmy the Gent" Rotondo, and his father expressed wishes for his son to become a criminal defense lawyer. His father was a union organizer for the Brooklyn chapter of the International Longshoremen's Association and underboss. Vincent was gunned down in front of his Brooklyn home because mob associates thought he might make an attempt to become boss of the family in 1988. In 1973, Rotondo graduated from Nazareth Regional High School in Canarsie, Brooklyn.

Life in the Mafia 
Rotondo became a made man in DeCavalcante crime family in 1982 and was promoted to Capo over his father's crew when the elder Rotondo was found in his car shot dead with a bottle of fish in his lap in 1988. Rotondo admitted to having played a part in three murders, those of Fred Weiss, Fat Louis LaRusso, and Joey Garafano. Fred Weiss was killed because he was an anti-crime crusader and the family wanted to be put back on the map by John Gotti, Fat Louis LaRasso was killed because John D'Amato (acting boss at the time) was afraid Larusso would try to pull off a coup, and mob associate Joey Garafano was killed because when he was assigned to drive a "crash car" during the murder of Fred Weiss (a car that was supposed to crash into any police cars coming to the scene) he stole the license plates for the car from another mobster's wife and was immediately questioned as a suspect in the murder.

Turning informant 
Anthony Rotondo Jr, the elder Rotondo's son, later turned informant and testified in a federal racketeering trial that began in February 2003, about the homicides of Fred Weiss, Louis LaRusso, and Joseph Garafano.

References

External links
https://web.archive.org/web/20110927135126/http://gangstersinc.tripod.com/ShoDec2804.html
https://web.archive.org/web/20090506101207/http://www.carvelli.com/noFlash/gotti-gang.html
https://web.archive.org/web/20080108145726/http://www.thelaborers.net/lexisnexis/951_f2d_1368-riggi.htm

1957 births
Living people
DeCavalcante crime family
People from Canarsie, Brooklyn
Federal Bureau of Investigation informants